XHQN-FM/XEQN-AM is a radio station on 105.9 FM and 740 AM in Torreón, Coahuila, Mexico. The station is owned by Grupo Fórmula and carries its Radio Fórmula news/talk format.

History
XEQN-AM received its concession in 1988 and was owned by the Nassar family, which also owned XHEN-FM 100.3. In 1997–98, both stations were transferred to Multimundo de Torreón.

In 2000, Multimundo sold XEQN to Radio Fórmula, years before the rest of the company's stations were sold to Grupo Imagen. In 2011, it moved to FM.

References

Radio stations in Coahuila
Radio stations in the Comarca Lagunera
Radio stations established in 1988
Radio Fórmula
Radio stations in Mexico with continuity obligations